Arhuaco is a Neotropical genus of butterflies in the nymphalid subfamily Satyrinae. The genus was erected by Michael Jan Adams and George Igor Bernard in 1977.

Species
Arhuaco dryadina (Schaus, 1913)
Arhuaco ica Adams & Bernard, 1977

References

Satyrinae
Nymphalidae of South America
Nymphalidae genera